The 2nd Assembly of Gilgit Baltistan was elected on 8 June 2015 by polls held across the province of Gilgit Baltistan. This assembly completed its full five year term on 23 June 2020 and dissolved on the same date.

Members of the assembly took oath on 24 June 2015.

Party position

List of Members of the 2nd Assembly of Gilgit Baltistan 
Members of the 2nd Assembly of Gilgit Baltistan are as follows:

References

 2nd
members of the 2nd Assembly of Gilgit Baltistan